is a Japanese professional baseball pitcher. He was born on January 18, 1989. He is currently playing for the Chiba Lotte Marines of the NPB.

His wife is a Japanese singer Ayumi Shibata.

References

1989 births
Living people
Baseball people from Wakayama Prefecture
Japanese baseball players
Nippon Professional Baseball pitchers
Chiba Lotte Marines players